Carmen Moore (born 24 December 1972) is a Canadian actress known for her work in television.

She is known for her role as Loreen Cassway on Arctic Air (for which she was nominated for a Leo Award in 2012) and the lead role of Leona Stoney, on the acclaimed series Blackstone (for which she has garnered five Leo nominations with three wins for Best Lead Performance and was nominated for a Gemini Award in 2011 and a Canadian Screen Award in 2017). She's also known for her role as Simone Cardinal on Godiva's for which she earned a 2006 Leo nomination.

Early life
Moore is of mixed heritage including Wet'suwet'en and is registered with the Hagwilget Village First Nation in Hazelton, British Columbia. She was born in Burnaby, British Columbia and grew up in Coquitlam, British Columbia. She attended Port Moody Senior Secondary School. In 1991 she joined the Spirit Song Native Theatre Co., and worked with them for 9 months. Her first professional theatre gig was with Theatre New Brunswick's Young Company tour in 1992 and got rave reviews. Carmen was nominated for a Jessie Richardson Award for Best Supporting Actress in Fend Players' Danceland in 1993. She continued her work in theatre, as well as auditioning for TV and film. For Firehall Arts Centre's Someday she was nominated for another Jessie, this time for Best Actress.

Career
From 2011 to 2015 she was the lead of the APTN TV show Blackstone in the role of Leona Stoney. For this she won three Leo Awards for Best Lead Performance by a Female in a Dramatic Series, in 2011, 2014, and 2016. Moore was also nominated for a Gemini Award for Best Performance by an Actress in a Continuing Leading Dramatic Role in 2011, was nominated for a 2016 UBCP/ACTRA Award for Blackstone and was nominated for a 2017 Canadian Screen Award.  She portrayed the role of Loreen Cassway on the CBC series Arctic Air from 2012 to 2014, for which she was nominated for the Best Supporting Performance by a Female in a Dramatic Series in 2012.

She received a Canadian Screen Award nomination for Best Actress at the 9th Canadian Screen Awards in 2021 for her performance in the film Rustic Oracle.

In 2021, Moore recurred on The Flash as Kristen Kramer.

Producing and directing career
Carmen has dabbled in the producing and directing side of the industry. She was associate producer on Two Indians Talking, and producer on White Indians Walking, both written by Andrew Genaille. Her directing debut happened in 2015 on the short film Ariel Unraveling, a BravoFACT Award winner.

Filmography

Film

Television

References

External links
 
 

Canadian film actresses
First Nations actresses
Canadian television actresses
Canadian voice actresses
Living people
People from Burnaby
Actresses from British Columbia
1972 births